Polyptychus hollandi is a moth of the family Sphingidae. It is known from forests from Nigeria to the Congo .

References

Polyptychus
Moths described in 1903
Insects of the Democratic Republic of the Congo
Insects of West Africa
Insects of Uganda
Fauna of the Central African Republic
Fauna of Gabon
Fauna of Zambia
Moths of Africa